John Henry Norton (31 December 1855 − 22 March 1923) was an Australian Roman Catholic bishop.

Biography
John Henry Norton was born in Ballarat, Victoria, on 31 December 1855.

Ordained to the priesthood on 8 April 1882, Norton was named bishop of the Roman Catholic Diocese of Port Augusta, South Australia, in 1906. He worked assiduously to develop his far-flung diocese.

He died at his home in Peterborough on 22 March 1923, while still in office.

References

1855 births
1923 deaths
People from Ballarat
20th-century Roman Catholic bishops in Australia
Roman Catholic bishops of Port Augusta
Contributors to the Catholic Encyclopedia